Tony Kellow (1 May 1952 – 20 February 2011) was an English professional footballer. He played as a forward and made over 400 Football League appearances in the 1970s and 1980s.

Early career
He was born in Budock Water, a village near Falmouth, and on leaving school he found employment in Falmouth Docks as an electrician, later turning out for the Falmouth Docks football side. At the age of seventeen he played in the South Western Football League for Penzance, helping them win the Cornwall Senior Cup in 1973. He then moved to his home-town side Falmouth Town, before moving back to play for Penzance in 1974/75, winning a South Western League championship medal. In 1975, he returned to Falmouth Town.

Football League
A centre-forward, his professional career began when he signed for Exeter City from Falmouth Town in 1976, for a fee of £12,000. Tony won the Football League's "Golden Boot" in 1980/81 for being the highest goal scorer in all four divisions. He was sold to Blackpool, in November 1978, for £125,000, which was Blackpool's record outlay at the time.

He returned to Exeter for a second spell, and joined Plymouth Argyle in 1983. After 13 appearances with Plymouth he moved to Swansea City in March 1984.

He then moved to Newport County, before a return for a third spell with Exeter.

Death
Kellow died on 20 February 2011, in Truro's Treliske Hospital of kidney failure after being found unconscious at his Budock Water home. He was 58 years old. His funeral service was held at St Budock Parish Church on 28 February 2011, and his body was then cremated at Truro's Penmount Crematorium. A memorial stone in honour of Kellow stands close to the Trelowarren Arms pub in Budock Water.

References

1952 births
2011 deaths
People from Falmouth, Cornwall
Footballers from Cornwall
English footballers
Association football forwards
Penzance A.F.C. players
Falmouth Town A.F.C. players
Exeter City F.C. players
Blackpool F.C. players
Plymouth Argyle F.C. players
Swansea City A.F.C. players
Newport County A.F.C. players
English Football League players
Exeter City F.C. non-playing staff